Shap Mochan is a Bengali romance drama film directed and produced by Sudhir Mukherjee based on a novel Sandhyaraag of Falguni Mukhopadhyay. This film was released in 1955 under the banner of Production Syndicate starring Uttam Kumar and Suchitra Sen in lead. Music director of the film was Hemanta Kumar Mukhopadhyay. The film remembered for its music and Uttam - Hemanta combination. There pair become popular after this film and one of the most popular singer actor duo in the history of Bengali cinema.

Plot
Young Mahendra belongs to a family of musicians, but once the family is cursed by their teacher. Mahendra's elder brother becomes blind and to avoid the same fate he goes to Kolkata and lives in the house of his father's friend Umeshchandra. He gets romantically involved with Umeshchandra's daughter Madhuri. Madhuri tries to make Mahendra modern and pursue his musical career. In spite of having good singing ability, Mahendra refuses to accept this due to his family values. He leaves their home and takes shelter in Kolkata. But the curse strikes him also and he falls seriously ill.

Cast
 Uttam Kumar as Mahendra
 Suchitra Sen as Madhuri
 Pahari Sanyal as Debendra
 Kamal Mitra as Umeshchandra
 Bikash Roy
 Jiben Bose
 Amar Mullick
 Tulsi Chakraborty
 Gangapada Basu
 Suprobha Devi
 Tapati Ghosh

Soundtrack

The songs become very popular. Hemanta Mukherjee was the music director of the movie and composed tunes for the songs. Lyrics were written by Bimal Ghosh (as Kavi Bimal Chandra Ghosh).

Reception
Film become blockbuster hit and ran for 77 days in theater. The songs become popular to the Bengali audiences and after the film Uttam and Hemanta combination become huge successful and regarded most popular Singer-actor duo in Bengali Cinema history.

References

External links
 

1955 films
Bengali-language Indian films
1955 romantic drama films
Films based on Indian novels
Films scored by Hemant Kumar
Indian romantic drama films
1950s Bengali-language films
Indian black-and-white films